The Party of Liberation and Socialism (abbr. PLS) was a communist party in Morocco that existed from 1968 to 1974. Ali Yata was the general secretary of the party.

History
The foundation of PLS was announced by Ali Yata on January 26, 1968. PLS was founded as a successor of the Moroccan Communist Party (PCM). PLS advocated establishing socialism adapted to Moroccan national conditions, and called for the unify patriotic forces in a 'United Popular Front' with anti-imperialist and anti-bourgeois characteristics.

The party was banned by the Moroccan government in 1969. Ali Yata was jailed.

PLS dissidents founded the Ila al-Amam group in 1970.

In 1974 the Party of Progress and Socialism (PPS) was founded as a successor of PLS.

References

1968 establishments in Morocco
1969 disestablishments in Morocco
Banned communist parties
Communist parties in Morocco
Defunct political parties in Morocco
Political parties established in 1968
Political parties disestablished in 1969